Drosanthemopsis is a genus of flowering plants belonging to the family Aizoaceae.

Its native range is South African Republic.

Species:

Drosanthemopsis bella 
Drosanthemopsis diversifolia 
Drosanthemopsis kwaganapensis 
Drosanthemopsis vaginata

References

Aizoaceae
Aizoaceae genera